Volim te... is the third studio album by Montenegrin dance-pop recording artist Dado Polumenta. It was released 15 June 2007 through the record label Gold Music.

Track listing
Ja noćas dolazim
Da sam tada bolje te znao
Gdje si sad
Fobija
Volim te...
Lažna imena
Laka ženo
Luče malo
Nije ti fino

External links
Volim te... at Discogs

2007 albums
Dado Polumenta albums